Rob Vonk (born 26 April 1950) is a Dutch modern pentathlete. He competed at the 1972 Summer Olympics.

References

1950 births
Living people
Dutch male modern pentathletes
Olympic modern pentathletes of the Netherlands
Modern pentathletes at the 1972 Summer Olympics
Sportspeople from The Hague